The Golden Bull Award is an award that is given annually by the Plain English Campaign to an organisation who has made what is deemed by the campaign to be a confusing and bad use of English (see gobbledygook).

Past "Winners" 

Started in 1980, this award has been famously (or infamously) given to the NHS for a 229 word definition of a bed, and in 1981 winners were sent a parcel of tripe through the mail.

 2004
 Bank of Scotland, British Airways, Department of Health, European Commission, The GENIUS Project (based at the University of Reading), Panorama Software, Trilogy Telecom, TriMedia

2007
 Virgin Trains for a letter about problems booking online
 UKTV for a press release
 BAA for a sign at Gatwick Airport
 Fastway Couriers for terms and conditions
 Nestle for a 'Project News Report'
 Translink for a sign at Coleraine railway station
 Warwickshire Children, Young People and Families Division  for meeting minutes

2008
 Scottish Life
 Met Office website
 HM Revenue and Customs
 The Co-operative ecotown website
 VCA Midlands Centre
 DC Site Services website
 Balfour Beatty
2014
 City of Edinburgh Council

See also
 Foot in Mouth Award

References

External links
Plain English Campaign Official Website

English language
Humorous literary awards